Nyoria Husainpur alias Neoria Husainpur, is a town and a nagar panchayat in Pilibhit district in the Indian state of Uttar Pradesh.

Demographics
As of the 2001 Census of India, Nyoria Husainpur had a population of 40,782. Males constitute 52% of the population and females 48%. Nyoria Husainpur has an average literacy rate of 29%, lower than the national average of 59.5%: male literacy is 37%, and female literacy is 20%.  In Nyoria Husainpur, 16% of the population is under 6 years of age. It is a Muslim dominated(88.30%, census 2011) town, specially Muslim Banjara community lives here. The main source of income of the town is agriculture.  This town was famous for the quality of earthen pot and rice.  It is 15 km north of the district center Pilibhit.  Neoria Hussainpur has improved a lot for their clear environment.

Nyoria husainpur roads and main entry gate is very famous in whole district pilibhit.
The Nyoria husainpur Famous Gali is Meena Bazaar specially for festival season.

In neyoria husainpur peoples are friendly and all religions live peacefully there . There are some picnic spots also nearby like chooka beach , mala jungle range ( tiger reserve ) and nanakmatta .

Employment
There is very less opportunities of employment, mostly people are based on agriculture in Neoria. Nowadays People traveling to metropolitan cities mostly Delhi, Gujrat for employment. Neoria is surrounded by villages Gauhar, Bithra, Neoria colony etc Village and the economy mainly depends on agriculture. The agricultural production depends on the weather, canal water system, and rains on proper time.

References

Cities and towns in Pilibhit district